Roger Charles Vowles (born 5 April 1932) is a former English cricketer.  Vowles was a right-handed batsman who bowled right-arm medium pace.  He was born at Grimsby, Lincolnshire.

Vowles made his first-class debut for Nottinghamshire against Derbyshire in the 1957 County Championship.  He made fifteen further first-class appearances for the county, the last of which came against Yorkshire.  In his sixteen first-class appearances for the county, he scored 292 runs at an average of 11.68, with a high score of 54.  This score was his only first-class half century and came on debut against Derbyshire. With the ball, he took 23 wickets at a bowling average of 40.00, with best figures of 4/106.

References

External links
Roger Vowles at ESPNcricinfo
Roger Vowles at CricketArchive

1932 births
Living people
Cricketers from Grimsby
English cricketers
Nottinghamshire cricketers